Faïrouz Malek also known as Faïrouz Ohlsson-Malek  is a French and Algerian physicist specializing in nuclear physics, particle physics and cosmology. A research scientist at the French National Centre for Scientific Research, she is involved in international research at the ATLAS experiment at the CERN LHC. She has contributed to the discovery of the Higgs boson and was the scientific leader of  the French  WLCG grid-computing  infrastructure. She is also known for her commitment to gender parity in science, as well as to the development of science in Africa. She is fellow of the African Academy of Sciences. She is the niece of Algerian composer Ahmed Malek.

Early life and education 
Malek studied at Algiers Omar Racim High School, where she specialized in mathematics. She graduated in physics at the University of Science and Technology Houari Boumediene. Malek earned a PhD in nuclear and particle physics at Université Grenoble-Alpes (former Joseph Fourier University), where she worked on the fission of hypernuclei.

Research and career 
Malek was member of an experiment at CERN, which research was about the quark–gluon plasma, in 2000. This state of matter is frequently compared to the primordial soup that existed shortly after the Big Bang. She was member of the Alpha Magnetic Spectrometer, a detector  installed in the International Space Station.

Malek joined the ATLAS experiment at CERN in 2000. She was leading the Grenoble group who were responsible for the design and prototyping of the Liquid Argon (LAr) Calorimeter. In 2012, together with the worldwide ATLAS experiment collaborators, she contributed to the discovery of the Higgs boson. 

Malek was President of the Alps branch of the French Physics Society, Société Française de Physique (SFP) from 2000 to 2002. She is also member of the European Physical Society since more than twenty years and served in the Physics for development group during four years (2010-2014). She served in the "Physics for development Committee (C13)" of the International Union of Pure and Applied Physics (IUPAP) organization from 2009 to 2015.

In 2019, Malek co-founded with Kétevi Assamagan among others, the African Strategy for Fundamental and Applied Physics, seeking to identify priorities, directions and means for the scientific research, education and capacity building for the African continent. In 2022, she  became member of the African Synchrotron Initiative Think Tank in view to set up a  Pan-African Synchrotron facility.

Gender parity in science 
Malek is involved in  equity and inclusion in science activities. She contributes to projects with the French national association Femmes et Sciences and founded and was th first president of the Association pour la Parité dans les Métiers Scientfiques et Techniques (APMST) in 2002. To promote women scientists, she coordinated the exhibition "La Science Taille XX elles" in Grenoble area.

Distinctions 
 From 2000 to 2002, she served as president of the Alpes branch of the French Physics Society
 On the occasion of the 60th anniversary of CERN, her profile was presented, among other scientists, at the Palais de la Découverte, from October 17, 2014 to July 19, 2015 in the exhibition "Experts in the field - Views on CERN ”  as well as on the “CERN 360° Experience” 
 In 2020, she was distinguished fellow of the African Academy of Sciences

Selected publications 
Malek has authored or co-authored more than 1200 articles, most of which deal with the physics of the ATLAS experiment. Among all of these articles, 18 have been cited more than 500 times.

Articles and book chapters
 Michèle Leduc, Faïrouz Malek et Roger Maynard, Reflets de la physique,‎ May 2007 
 Faïrouz Malek, Reflets de la physique,‎ July- August 2010
 Faïrouz Malek, Micro Hebdo,‎ 2010
 Faïrouz Malek, Reflets de la Physique,‎ October 2011
 Faïrouz Malek, Pour la Science,‎ 25 October 2013
 Faïrouz Malek, Book chapter, CNRS Editions, 2017, 368 p., « Le CERN et les Big Data »

References 

Living people
1964 births
20th-century Algerian physicists
21st-century Algerian physicists
Fellows of the African Academy of Sciences
University of Science and Technology Houari Boumediene alumni
French National Centre for Scientific Research scientists